Pamela Levy (1949–2004) was an Israeli artist.

Biography
Pamela Denman (later Levy) was born in Fairfield, Iowa. She completed her B.A. at the University of Northern Iowa. In 1972, she moved to New Mexico and joined an artists commune in Santa Fe. In 1976, she immigrated to Israel after converting to Judaism and marrying Itamar Levy, a psychologist and art critic.

In 2004, Levy died in Jerusalem of cardiac arrest.

Art career
Levy's early works were hand-sewn textile collages influenced by the feminist Pattern and Decoration art movement. From the 1980s, she began to paint large figurative oils based on photographs.

Awards and recognition
In 1980, Levy won a Guggenheim Foundation grant. In 1987, she won the Jacques and Eugene O'Hana Prize for a young Israeli artist, and in 1990, she was awarded the Israel Minister of Education and Culture Prize for Painting and Sculpture. She participated in group exhibitions at the Israel Museum in Jerusalem, and held solo exhibitions at the Tel Aviv and Herzliya art museums, as well as art galleries in the United States, Germany, Australia and Israel. In 1996 she received a Heitland Foundation Grant, taking her to Hanover, Germany. The following year she was an Artist in Residence at the Canberra School of Art in Australia.

Solo exhibitions
1978 Russ Gallery, Tel Aviv, Israel
1979 Debel Gallery, Jerusalem, Israel
1981 American Cultural Center, Jerusalem, Israel
1981 Artists' House, Jerusalem, Israel
1981 Alternate Space Gallery, New York City, United States
1982 Ahad Ha'am Gallery, Tel Aviv, Israel
1985 Aika Brown Gallery, Artists' Studios, Jerusalem, Israel
1987 Gimel Gallery, Jerusalem, Israel
1987 Artifact Gallery, Tel Aviv, Israel
1989 Aika Brown Gallery, Artists' Studios, Jerusalem, Israel
1990 Nelly Aman Gallery, Tel Aviv, Israel
1994 "Paintings, 1983-1994", Tel Aviv Museum of Art, Tel Aviv, Israel (catalogue)
1995 Galerie im b.i.b., Hanover, Germany (catalogue)
1995 Galerie Zonig and Mock, Hanover, Germany (catalogue)
1996 Nelly Aman Gallery, Tel Aviv, Israel
1996 Kunstverein, Holzminden, Germany
1997 Nelly Aman Gallery, Tel Aviv, Israel
1997 "Aquarelle und Olbilder", Kunstverein, Gifhorn, Germany
1997 Photospace, Canberra School of Art, ANU, Canberra, Australia
1999 "Paintings: Class Picture", Herzliya Museum of Art, Herzliya, Israel (catalogue)
1999 Nelly Aman Gallery, Tel Aviv, Israel
2001 "Paintings", Golconda Fine Art, Tel Aviv, Israel (catalogue)
2002 "Woodcuts", Gallery of the David Yelin Teachers Academy, Jerusalem
2003 "Pamela's Zoo", Golconda Fine Art, Tel Aviv, Israel (catalogue)

Book illustrations
1998 Monsoon: Poems by Media by Dahlia Ravikovitch, with woodcuts by Pamela Levy, Even Hoshen, Ra'anana

See also
Visual arts in Israel

References

External links
Pamela Levy on Artnet
Pamela Levy at AskArt (images of 4 paintings)
Pamela Levy at the Hittleman Gallery

1949 births
2004 deaths
20th-century Israeli women artists
21st-century Israeli women artists
American emigrants to Israel
20th-century American Jews
Israeli women painters
People from Fairfield, Iowa
University of Northern Iowa alumni
21st-century American Jews